Aleksandr Yakovlevich Khinchin (July 19, 1894 – November 18, 1959) was a Soviet mathematician and one of the most significant contributors to  the Soviet school of probability theory.

Life and career
He was born in the village of Kondrovo, Kaluga Governorate, Russian Empire. While studying at Moscow State University, he became one of the first followers of the famous Luzin school. Khinchin graduated from the university in 1916 and six years later he became a full professor there, retaining that position until his death.

Khinchin's early works focused on real analysis. Later he applied methods from the metric theory of functions to problems in probability theory and number theory. He became one of the founders of modern probability theory, discovering the law of the iterated logarithm in 1924, achieving important results in the field of limit theorems, giving a definition of a stationary process and laying a foundation for the theory of such processes.

Khinchin made significant contributions to the metric theory of Diophantine approximations and established an important result for simple real continued fractions, discovering a property of such numbers that leads to what is now known as Khinchin's constant. He also published several important works on statistical physics, where he used the methods of probability theory, and on information theory, queuing theory and mathematical analysis.

In 1939 Khinchin was elected as a Correspondent Member of the Academy of Sciences of the USSR. He was awarded the Stalin Prize (1941), the Order of Lenin, three other orders, and medals.

See also
Pollaczek–Khinchine formula
Wiener–Khinchin theorem
Khinchin inequality
Equidistribution theorem
Khinchin's constant
Khinchin–Lévy constant
Khinchin's theorem on Diophantine approximations
Law of the iterated logarithm
Palm-Khintchine Theorem
Weak law of large numbers (Khinchin's law)
Lévy–Khintchin formula of characteristic function of Lévy process

Bibliography
Sur la Loi des Grandes Nombres, in Comptes Rendus de l'Académie des Sciences, Paris, 1929
Asymptotische Gesetze der Wahrscheinlichkeitsrechnung, Berlin: Julius Springer, 1933
Continued Fractions, Mineola, N.Y. : Dover Publications, 1997,  (first published in Moscow, 1935)
Three Pearls of Number Theory, Mineola, NY : Dover Publications, 1998,  (first published in Moscow and Leningrad, 1947)
Mathematical Foundations of Quantum Statistics, Mineola, N.Y. : Dover Publications, 1998,  (first published in Moscow and Leningrad, 1951; trans. in 1960 by Irwin Shapiro)
Mathematical Foundations of Information Theory, Dover Publications, 1957,

References

External links

List of books by Khinchin provided by National Library of Australia
A.Ya. Khinchin at Math-Net.Ru.

20th-century Russian mathematicians
Soviet mathematicians
Number theorists
Probability theorists
Queueing theorists
Stalin Prize winners
Moscow State University alumni
Academic staff of Moscow State University
Corresponding Members of the USSR Academy of Sciences
1894 births
1959 deaths
Burials at Donskoye Cemetery